Frank Joseph Polozola (January 15, 1942 – February 24, 2013) was a United States district judge of the United States District Court for the Middle District of Louisiana.

Education and career

Born in Baton Rouge, Louisiana, Polozola received a Bachelor of Laws in 1965 from the Paul M. Hebert Law Center at Louisiana State University. He was a law clerk for Judge Elmer Gordon West of the United States District Court for the Middle District of Louisiana from 1965 to 1966. He was in private practice in Baton Rouge from 1966 to 1973. He began teaching in 1977 at the Paul M. Hebert Law Center.

Federal judicial service

Polozola was a part-time United States Magistrate of the United States District Court for the Middle District of Louisiana from 1972 to 1973 and a full-time United States Magistrate for the same court from 1973 to 1980.

On April 2, 1980, Polozola was nominated by President Jimmy Carter to the seat on the United States District Court for the Middle District of Louisiana vacated by his former mentor, Judge West. Polozola was confirmed by the U.S. Senate on May 21, 1980, and received his commission two days later. Polozola served as Chief Judge from 1998 to 2005. He assumed senior status on January 15, 2007. Polozola died on February 24, 2013, in Baton Rouge.

Notable cases

In September 1980, Polozola presided over the racketeering and extortion trial of former Louisiana Commissioner of Agriculture and Forestry Gil Dozier of Baton Rouge. When Dozier was found to have engaged in jury tampering in his original trial while on bond, Polozola added eight years to the original ten-year sentence. In 1984, Dozier's term was commuted by President Reagan, over Judge Polozola's objections.

Polozola presided over the sentencing of Barry Seal, who was murdered less than two months later. In December 1984, Seal, a high level informant for the DEA, was arrested in Louisiana for flying a cargo of marijuana into the state. The terms of Seal's cooperation agreement with federal investigators effectively shielded him from serving hard time for narcotic trafficking. On 20 December 1985, Polozola invoked the sentence handed down by a Florida judge as he was required to under the terms of Seal's deal with the government and sentenced Seal to six months' supervised probation. Polozola was furious at being powerless to impose a harsher sentence took the occasion to say that people like Seal were "the lowest, most despicable people I can think of." A condition of the sentence was that he had to spend every night, from 6 p.m. to 6 a.m., at the Salvation Army halfway house on Airline Highway in Baton Rouge. Polozola further stipulated that Seal could not carry a gun or hire armed bodyguards as this would be possession or constructive possession of a firearm by a convicted felon - both federal felonies. Seal was offered protection, but refused. Seal's attorney, Lewis Unglesby, told Polozola his ruling amounted to a death sentence for his client. Seal told friends that the judge "made me a clay pigeon." At 6 p.m. on February 19, 1986, Seal promptly drove up to the Salvation Army in his white Cadillac. As he parked his car, he was approached by a man carrying an automatic weapon. Two quick bursts riddled Seal's head and chest, killing him instantly.

In 2000, Polozola presided over the criminal trial of former Governor Edwin Edwards.

References

Sources
 

1942 births
2013 deaths
People from Baton Rouge, Louisiana
Louisiana State University Law Center alumni
Louisiana State University faculty
Judges of the United States District Court for the Middle District of Louisiana
United States district court judges appointed by Jimmy Carter
20th-century American judges
Louisiana Democrats
United States magistrate judges
American people of Italian descent